Walter David Graham (21 October 1889 – 29 March 1965) was an  Australian rules footballer who played with St Kilda in the Victorian Football League (VFL).

Notes

External links 

1889 births
1965 deaths
Australian rules footballers from Victoria (Australia)
St Kilda Football Club players
Brighton Football Club players